This is a list of people who have served as Lord Lieutenant of Nottinghamshire. Since 1694, all Lords Lieutenant have also been Custos Rotulorum of Nottinghamshire.

Henry Manners, 2nd Earl of Rutland 1552–1563?
Edward Manners, 3rd Earl of Rutland 1574–1587?
John Manners, 4th Earl of Rutland 3 December 1587 – 24 February 1588
George Talbot, 6th Earl of Shrewsbury 31 December 1588 – 8 November 1590
vacant
William Cavendish, 1st Earl of Newcastle 6 July 1626 – 1642
Interregnum
William Cavendish, 1st Duke of Newcastle-upon-Tyne 30 July 1660 – 25 December 1676
Henry Cavendish, 2nd Duke of Newcastle-upon-Tyne 28 March 1677 – 28 March 1689
William Pierrepont, 4th Earl of Kingston-upon-Hull 28 March 1689 – 17 September 1690
vacant
William Cavendish, 1st Duke of Devonshire 6 May 1692 – 4 June 1694
John Holles, 1st Duke of Newcastle-upon-Tyne 4 June 1694 – 15 July 1711
vacant
Thomas Pelham-Holles, 1st Duke of Newcastle-upon-Tyne 28 October 1714 – 15 January 1763
Evelyn Pierrepont, 2nd Duke of Kingston-upon-Hull 15 January 1763 – 12 September 1765
Thomas Pelham-Holles, 1st Duke of Newcastle-upon-Tyne 12 September 1765 – 17 November 1768
Henry Pelham-Clinton, 2nd Duke of Newcastle-under-Lyne 28 December 1768 – 22 February 1794
Thomas Pelham-Clinton, 3rd Duke of Newcastle-under-Lyne 2 May 1794 – 17 May 1795
William Cavendish-Bentinck, 3rd Duke of Portland 19 June 1795 – 30 October 1809
Henry Pelham-Clinton, 4th Duke of Newcastle-under-Lyne 8 December 1809 – 10 May 1839
John Lumley-Savile, 8th Earl of Scarbrough 10 May 1839 – 29 October 1856
Henry Pelham-Clinton, 5th Duke of Newcastle-under-Lyne 4 December 1857 – 18 October 1864
Edward Strutt, 1st Baron Belper 6 December 1864 – 30 June 1880
William Beauclerk, 10th Duke of St Albans 25 August 1880 – 10 May 1898
William Cavendish-Bentinck, 6th Duke of Portland 2 June 1898 – 10 October 1939
William Cavendish-Bentinck, 7th Duke of Portland 10 October 1939 – 17 May 1962
Sir Robert Laycock 17 May 1962 – 10 March 1968
Robert St Vincent Sherbrooke 7 June 1968 – 13 June 1972
Philip Francklin 6 October 1972 – 9 February 1983
Sir Gordon Hobday 9 February 1983 – 11 February 1991
Sir Andrew Buchanan, Bt 11 February 1991 – July 2012
Sir John Peace, July 2012 – present

Deputy lieutenants
A deputy lieutenant of Nottinghamshire is commissioned by the Lord Lieutenant of Nottinghamshire. Deputy lieutenants support the work of the lord-lieutenant. There can be several deputy lieutenants at any time, depending on the population of the county. Their appointment does not terminate with the changing of the lord-lieutenant, but they usually retire at age 75.

19th Century
20 December 1803: The Earl Manvers
15 February 1842: Francis Thornhaugh Foljambe, Esq.

References

External links
 
 

Nottinghamshire
 
History of Nottinghamshire